His Lordship's Dilemma is a 1915 silent short comedy film produced by the Gaumont Film Company and distributed by the Mutual Film Corporation. The film stars W.C. Fields as a remittance man, and part of the film includes an adaptation of the comedian's famous golf routine. It was directed by William F. Haddock.

Supporting players include Bud Ross, who also appeared with Fields in Pool Sharks earlier the same year; and Fields' brother Walter, in his only known film appearance, listed in various sources as Walter Dukinfield or Walter Fields (the family name is usually rendered as Dukenfield).

Preservation status
"His Lordship's Dilemma" is a lost film.

References

External links
His Lordship's Dilemma at the Internet Movie Database

American silent short films
American black-and-white films
1915 comedy films
1915 films
Remittance men
Silent American comedy films
1915 short films
American comedy short films
Lost American films
1915 lost films
Lost comedy films
1910s American films